Schweizer-Reneke, sometimes referred to as Schweizer, is a town  in the North West Province of South Africa. It is the administrative centre of Mamusa Local Municipality. It is commonly referred to as Schweizer/ Mzwera.

History 

Schweizer-Reneke was formerly part of the old Transvaal Republic. Founded on 1 October 1888, the town is situated on the banks of the Harts River, with six regional roads exiting the town. The town is named after Captain C.A. Schweizer and Field Cornet C.N. Reyneke. Both men distinguished themselves and were among the ten soldiers killed while storming the stronghold of the Khoekhoe Korana and their chief David Massouw on the nearby Mamusa Hill on 2 December 1885 during an action to put an end to cattle rustling in the area. The remains of the stone fortifications of Chief David Massouw can still be seen on Mamusa Hill.

Economy 

The principal crops of the region around Schweizer-Reneke are mainly maize, cotton, groundnuts, sunflower seeds and soybeans. In addition, cattle and sheep farming is practiced in the region on a relatively large scale on the grasslands where the soil is unsuitable for cultivation. Schweizer-Reneke is rich in diamond deposits. This led to large scale private diamond mining in the area.

Wenzel Dam, just north of the town on the Harts River, has been developed into a holiday resort but sadly is now in decay.

Demographics 
According to the 2001 census, the town of Schweizer-Reneke proper has a population of 2,601, while the adjacent township of Ipelegeng has a population of 30,053, giving the urban area a total population of 32,654.

91.5% of the people in the urban area described themselves as "Black African", 5.6% as "White", 2.5% as "Coloured", and 0.4% as "Indian or Asian". 69.8% of the people of the town proper described themselves as "White", whereas 98.4% of the people of Ipelegeng township described themselves as "Black African".

85.6% of the people in the urban area speak Tswana as their first language, while 7.3% speak Afrikaans, 3.5% speak Sotho and 1.7% speak Xhosa.

Education 
The town has public secondary schools:
Hoërskool Schweizer Reneke
Ipelegeng High School
Itshupeng Secondary School
Reabetswe Secondary School

It also has public primary schools:
Laerskool Schweizer Reneke
Kolong Primary School
Ikgomotseng Primary School
Kgatontle Primary School
Tshwaraganelo Primary School
Mamusa Primary School
Charon Primary School
 Roshunville Primary School

Notable people 
 Joyce Murray, Canadian politician
 Wynand Claassen, former Springbok rugby captain was born here.
 Ahmed Kathrada a South African politician
 Elisabeth Eybers –  Poet
 Irma Stern – Artist
 Essop Pahad, politician
 Pieter Labuschagne, rugby player
 Nhlanhla Nciza, lead singer of Mafikizolo

Sport 

Schweizer Reneke is home to a soccer club "Mamusa United FC" that plays in the provincial football league.
There is also a big soccer team formed by the Department of Social Development: Mamusa Service Point. The team boasts with local popular players like Molwantwa Sheriff Lehihi, Kwenzekile Scova Mqweba and Peter Maiyane Kgalapa amongst others.

See also  	
Taung
Ipelegeng

References  	

Populated places in the Mamusa Local Municipality
Populated places established in 1888